Kopela  is a village in the Gadchiroli district of Maharashtra, India.

Geography
It has an average elevation of 127 metres (419 feet).

It lies on National highway No 16 between Nizamabad in Andhra Pradesh and Jagdalpur in Chhattisgarh State.

It is on the border of Maharashtra and Chhattisgarh states.

References

Villages in Gadchiroli district